Flys may refer to:

 The Flys (American band)
 The Flys (British band)
 Volodymyr Flys (1924–1987), Ukrainian composer

See also
 Fly (disambiguation)